The Esk Valley Walk is a long distance footpath in North Yorkshire, England. The route first follows a loop on the North York Moors to the south of Castleton, then shadows the River Esk on its journey to the North Sea. Waymarking uses the symbol of a leaping salmon, with yellow arrows denoting footpaths and blue arrows bridleways.

From Castleton the route leads to Danby Dale, Rosedale Head and Blakey Ridge. It then passes through the remains of Esklets, a medieval sheep farm, and on to Westerdale and, passing Castleton once more, Eskdale proper. Next it reaches Danby, including the Moors National Park Centre located just outside Danby, and then climbs to Danby Beacon. From here it leads to Leaholm, Glaisdale, Egton Bridge and Grosmont, the terminus of the North Yorkshire Moors Railway. The final section passes through Ruswarp to reach the end of the route at the old port of Whitby.

See also
 Yorkshire Esk Trail

References

External links
North York Moors National Park North York Moors National Park 
Esk Valley Walk Esk Valley Walk
North York Moors CAM Personal account of walking the Esk Valley 
Dalesman Egton Bridge to Sleights walk

Footpaths in North Yorkshire
Long-distance footpaths in England
North York Moors